Shamha Ahmed (born 8 April 1982 in Male’) is an athlete from the Maldives who represents the country in Athletics.

Career
Born to a family of 8, Shamha first competed in the Inter House Athletics Meet where she broke the Maldives 100m record in 1998, finishing at a time of 13:20s.

Shamha first represented Maldives in 1998 at the Junior World Championship in Annecy, France. In 2000, she competed in the 100 meters sprint in the year 2000 Sydney Olympics, Australia. She ran in first round of the main event with her a time of 12.87s. In 2001, Shamha broke the National record by finishing the race at 12.27s at the World Championships, Edmonton Canada

The athlete took a break from athletics in 2004 to move to Germany, where she lives now with her sons, Luca Hansen and Jonah Hansen.

In March, 2014, Shamha broke the Half Marathon National Record at the World Half Marathon Championship, Copenhagen, Denmark finishing the race at 1:42:04s.

Shamha won her first Bronze Medal at the 2015 Indian Ocean Island Games, finishing the 10000m race at 45:12:36, being the first female athlete to win a medal for the Maldives in an International Games and also setting a new National Record for 10000m.

The Maldives team set a National Record for 4x100m relay at the 2016 South Asian Games. Shamha was amongst the four who completed the race along with Afa Ismail, Aminath Nazra and Mirfath Ahmed.

The Athletes set National Record for 5 km in February 2017, at the Hardter Carnival Run finishing at a time of 22:34s.

National records

Achievements

See also
List of Maldivian records in athletics

References

External links
 

1982 births
Living people
Maldivian female athletes